The Russian Second Division 2008 was the third strongest Division in Russian football. The Second Division is geographically divided into 5 zones.
The winners of each zone are automatically promoted into the First Division. The bottom finishers of each zone lose professional status and are relegated into the Amateur Football League.

South

Top scorers
27 goals

 Mikhail Markosov (FC Dynamo Stavropol)

17 goals
Dmitry Mezinov (FC Bataysk-2007)
Vladimir Serov (FC Rotor Volgograd)
Artur Yelbayev (FC Avtodor Vladikavkaz)

16 goals

 Ivan Gerasimov (FC Olimpia Volgograd)

15 goals

 Dmitri Pinchuk (FC Olimpia Volgograd / FC Zhemchuzhina-Sochi)

14 goals

 Yevgeni Losev (FC Volgar-Gazprom-2 Astrakhan)

12 goals

 Nizar Al-Taravna (FC Bataysk-2007)
 Denis Dorozhkin (FC Krasnodar)
 Dmitri Kovalenko (FC Olimpia Volgograd)

West

Top scorers
18 goals

 Aleksei Baranov (FC Torpedo-RG Moscow / FC MVD Rossii Moscow)

17 goals

 Ramaz Dzhabnidze (FC Dmitrov / FC Zelenograd)

16 goals

 Andrei Opanasyuk (FC Spartak Kostroma)

15 goals

 Yuri Kapusta (FC Nara-ShBFR Naro-Fominsk)
 Vadim Klass (FC Sever Murmansk)

13 goals
Grigory Gnedov (FC Spartak Kostroma)

12 goals

 Dmitri Vyazmikin (FC Torpedo Vladimir)

10 goals

 Andrei Bubchikov (FC Tekstilshchik Ivanovo)
 Andrei Dyomkin (FC Sheksna Cherepovets / FC MVD Rossii Moscow)
 Kirill Makarov (FC Zenit-2 St. Petersburg)
 Andrei Smirnov (FC Torpedo Vladimir)
 Ivan Stolbovoy (FC Volga Tver)
 Ruslan Usikov (FC Dynamo St. Petersburg / FC MVD Rossii Moscow)
 Aleksei Zhelatin (FC Pskov-747)

Center

Top scorers
17 goals

 Andrei Meshchaninov (FC Zvezda Serpukhov)

16 goals

 Artur Grigoryan (FC Lokomotiv Liski)

14 goals

 Oleg Shchyotkin (FC Zenit Penza)

13 goals

 Anzour Nafash (FC Lukhovitsy)
 Denis Zhukovskiy (FC Dynamo-Voronezh Voronezh)

11 goals

 Sergei Faustov (FC Gubkin)
 Andrei Meshcheryakov (FC Lokomotiv Liski)

10 goals

 Kirill Kurochkin (FC Mordovia Saransk)
 Sergei Mikhailov (FC Avangard Kursk)
 Anton Sereda (FC Yelets)
 Vasili Shatalov (FC Saturn-2 Moscow Oblast)
 Denis Snimshchikov (FC Mordovia Saransk)

Ural-Povolzhye

Top scorers
27 goals
 Mikhail Tyufyakov (FC Rubin-2 Kazan / FC Lada Togliatti)

23 goals
 Ilya Borodin (FC Nizhny Novgorod)

17 goals
 Stanislav Prokofyev (FC Volga Nizhny Novgorod)

15 goals
 Marat Shogenov (FC Gazovik Orenburg)

14 goals
 Yevgeni Yaroslavtsev (FC SOYUZ-Gazprom Izhevsk)
 Dmitri Zarva (FC Tyumen)

13 goals
 Artyom Delkin (FC Togliatti)
 Vladimir Morozov (FC Zenit Chelyabinsk)
 Aleksandr Pavlov (FC Tyumen)

12 goals
 Yuri Budylin (FC Alnas Almetyevsk)
 Anatoli Zavyalov (FC Gornyak Uchaly)

East

Top scorers
14 goals
 Anton Bagayev (FC Irtysh-1946 Omsk)

13 goals
 Stanislav Goncharov (FC Metallurg Krasnoyarsk)

12 goals
 Vyacheslav Chadov (FC Amur Blagoveshchensk)
 Andrei Lodis (FC Smena Komsomolsk-na-Amure)
 Grigori Pogonyshev (FC Sibiryak Bratsk)

9 goals
 Roman Belyayev (FC Sibir-2 Novosibirsk)
 Aleksandr Shtyn (FC KUZBASS Kemerovo)
 Maksim Zhivnovitskiy (FC Chita)

8 goals
 Ilya Levin (FC Smena Komsomolsk-na-Amure)
 Yevgeni Polyakov (FC Sibir-2 Novosibirsk)
 Artyom Rudovskiy (FC Smena Komsomolsk-na-Amure)

References
 PFL
 Soccerway

3
Russian Second League seasons
Russia
Russia